Edward Hornor Coates (November 12, 1846 – December 23, 1921) was a Philadelphia businessman, financier, and patron of the arts and sciences.  He served as a director of the Mechanics National Bank in 1873, was chairman of the Committee on Instruction at the Pennsylvania Academy of the Fine Arts from 1883 to 1890, and held the position of Academy president from 1890 to 1906.

Biography

He was the son of Joseph Potts Hornor Coates and Eliza Henri Troth, a family of Quakers.  An 1864 graduate of Haverford College, he married (first) Ella May Potts in 1872, who died on 9 May 1874 at the age of 22. He married (second) Florence Van Leer Earle Coates in 1879, the daughter of prominent Philadelphia lawyer George H. Earle Sr and granddaughter of U.S. Army officer Samuel Van Leer. This was also a second marriage for Florence, her first husband – William Nicholson – died in 1877 after only five years of marriage.  Coates would eventually adopt Florence's daughter from her first marriage, Alice Earle Nicholson.  Florence and Edward had one child together in 1881, but the baby, Josephine Wisner Coates, died in infancy.

The family had a city house at 1018 Spruce Street and a suburban house — "Willing Terrace" —  in the Germantown section of Philadelphia. A frequent guest was literary and social critic Matthew Arnold, whom they would host during his stays in Philadelphia. Mrs. Coates was both inspired and encouraged by Mr. Arnold to pursue her interest in writing poetry. This would eventually lead to the publishing of nearly three hundred poems in the leading magazines of her day, as well as five volumes of collected verse. The family spent the summer months in the Adirondacks, where they owned "Camp Elsinore," a summer retreat by Upper St. Regis Lake. There they entertained, rested, and escaped the humidity of Philadelphia summers.  Many of Mrs. Coates' nature poems were inspired by the flora and fauna of the Adirondacks. About 1908, the couple moved to a city house at 2024 Spruce Street, near Rittenhouse Square, where they resided for the remainder of their lives.

Pennsylvania Academy of the Fine Arts
Painter John McLure Hamilton, in a chapter about Coates from his book Men I Have Painted (1921), describes Coates' tenure at PAFA:

The reign of Mr. Coates at the Academy marked the period of its greatest prosperity.  Rich endowments were made to the schools, a gallery of national portraiture was formed, and some of the best examples of Gilbert Stuart's work acquired.  The annual exhibitions attained a brilliancy and éclat hitherto unknown... Mr. Coates wisely established the schools upon a conservative basis, building almost unconsciously the dykes high against the oncoming flow of insane novelties in art patterns... In this last struggle against modernism the President was ably supported by Eakins, Anschutz, Grafly, [Henry Joseph] Thouron, Vonnoh, and Chase... His unfailing courtesy, his disinterested thoughtfulness, his tactfulness, and his modesty endeared him to scholars and masters alike.  No sacrifice of time or of means was too great, if he thought he could accomplish the end he always had in view—the honour and the glory of the Academy.

Thomas Eakins became director of the school at PAFA in 1882, and Coates became chairman of instruction (and Eakins' superior) the following year. Coates commissioned The Swimming Hole from Eakins in 1884 as a work to be added to PAFA's permanent collection, only later to exchange it for the artist's Singing the Pathetic Song (1881). The nudity of the men in The Swimming Hole was unlikely to have bothered Coates, he and Eakins served as PAFA's representatives overseeing Eadweard Muybridge's photographic studies of the human body in motion. But most of the men in Eakins' painting were PAFA students, and having students pose nude for an instructor was contrary to PAFA policy. In January 1886, when Eakins had a male model remove his loincloth before either a female class or a mixed male-and-female class – also contrary to PAFA policy – Coates wrote him a letter of reprimand. But the incident soon snowballed into a full-blown scandal, with accusations of sexual impropriety (and even incest) against Eakins. Coates requested and received his resignation. Although their friendship was strained, Coates remained a supporter of the artist. When an Eakins client balked at paying for the bas-relief panels Knitting and Spinning, Coates bought them and donated them to PAFA. On 24 January 1890, Coates addressed the Art Club of Philadelphia on "The Academy of the Fine Arts and Its Future," urging that "what the Academy now needs more than all else,—and it is worthy an eloquent and convincing plea,—is the intelligent interest and sympathetic co-operation of every citizen."

Pennsylvania politics
In 1890, Coates was among the signatories of the "Independent Republicans of Pennsylvania" who backed the Democratic nominee Robert E. Pattison for Governor over the Republican nominee, George W. Delamater.  A vote for Delamater, they stressed, would mean "the public indorsement" of the corrupt Matthew Stanley Quay, then the junior U.S. senator from Pennsylvania. Pattison would go on to win the Governorship.  In 1894, Coates joined the ranks of the "Quaker City Rebels" in the continued fight against Quay and corrupt "bossism" politics.

Death and legacy
Edward Hornor Coates died on 23 December 1921. A funeral service was held at his Spruce Street house three days later, and he was buried at the Church of the Redeemer (Episcopal) churchyard in Bryn Mawr, Pennsylvania.  The inscription on Coates' headstone – "High thought seated in a heart of courtesy" – was Sir Phillip Sydney's description of an honorable man and gentleman.

On 31 March 1922, a "valuable collection of personal association books and first editions of English and American Authors" owned by Coates is sold at a Stan V. Henkels auction.

In 1923, Mrs. Coates presented The Edward H. Coates Memorial Collection to the Pennsylvania Academy of the Fine Arts. This included Robert Vonnoh's 1893 portrait of Coates (shown above); The Tragic Muse, a 1912 portrait of Mrs. Coates by Violet Oakley; Old Ocean's Gray and Melancholy Waste (1885) by William Trost Richards (winner of PAFA's 1885 Temple Medal); and sculptor Charles Grafly's 1903 portrait bust of Coates. Twenty-four other paintings by various artists, as well as two other pieces of sculpture, were also in the collection. It was exhibited together at the Academy from 4 November 1923 to 10 January 1924.

References

External links
 http://mechanicsnationalbank.com/members/edward-coates/
 

1846 births
1921 deaths
Businesspeople from Philadelphia
People associated with the Pennsylvania Academy of the Fine Arts
American bankers
Pennsylvania Republicans